Casa de Campo is a station on Line 5 and Line 10 of the Madrid Metro that is situated near the Paseo de la Puerta de Batán in the Moncloa-Aravaca district. It is located in fare Zone A.

History
The station was opened on 22 October 2002 as part of the extension of Line 10 from Batán to Puerta del Sur, which was one of two parts of the Metrosur expansion project. As part of the project, the segment between Casa de Campo and Aluche was transferred to Line 5; the station itself was designed to have space for four tracks and two island platforms, but one of the tracks is covered by an expanded island platform to enable cross-platform transfers between Line 5 and Line 10. Prior to the construction of the station, Line 10 trains passed through the station site without stopping, so this station is considered to be an infill station on Line 10.

References 

Line 5 (Madrid Metro) stations
Line 10 (Madrid Metro) stations
Railway stations in Spain opened in 2002